

Events
Mobster Antonino Morddelo "Tony," "Joe Batters" Accardo becomes head enforcer for Al Capone's "Chicago Outfit". 
Danny Stanton, a former member of the Valley and Sheldon Gangs, assumes control as interim leader of arch rivals Saltis-McErlane organization.  
January 8 – Unione Siciliane leader Pasquale Lolordo is killed in his Chicago apartment, supposedly by mobster Joe Aiello and members of the North Side Gang. 
January 12 – Labor racketeer Cornelius Shea died in a hospital in Chicago after an operation for gallstones.
February 14 – Four unidentified men, two of them dressed as Chicago police officers, storm into a Chicago garage and murder seven members of the North Side Gang, (among them optometrist Rheinhart Schwimmer and mechanic John May).  Their primary target, gang leader George "Bugs" Moran, is not there.  However, the St. Valentines Day Massacre effectively ends the five-year gang war between The Chicago Outfit and the North Side Gang. 
March 19 – William J. Vercoe, a colorful Chicago criminal noted for reciting poetry, is shot and killed by Westside O'Donnell gang member William Clifford while at the Pony Inn in Cicero, Illinois. 
April 14 – William Clifford is gunned down along with former Westside O'Donnall's gang gunman Michael Reiley. 
May 7 – Chicago Outfit hitmen Albert Anselmi and John Scalise, two of the men suspected in the murder of North Side Gang leader Dean O'Banion and fellow mob boss Joseph "Hop Toad" Giunta, the current Unione Siculiana President are all killed during a lavish party held at Al Capone's residence. The party was a ruse by mob boss Al Capone to lure the three men to their deaths after their plan to gain leadership of the Chicago Outfit by eliminating Capone is uncovered. The men where beaten to death by Capone, who used a baseball bat to commit the murders. 
May 9 – Prominent New York mob associate Meyer Lansky marries Anna Citron. 
May 13–15 – The Atlantic City Conference is held in Atlantic City, New Jersey by American East Coast and Midwest organized crime leaders.  This conference would later result in the formation of the National Crime Syndicate of all Italian-American gangs. 
May 16 – Shortly after leaving the Atlantic City, New Jersey meeting, Chicago mob boss Al Capone is arrested by Philadelphia police and charged with carrying a concealed weapon. 
May 16 – Bootlegger Joe Porrazo "Disappears" after alleged confrontation with organized Crime Figures {Joseph Ardizzone}
May 29 – Thomas McElligot, a member of the Westside O'Donnell's gang, is killed in a Loop saloon in Chicago. 
June 11 – Salvatore "Black Sam" Todaro, a Cleveland, Ohio mafia leader, the #2 man or underboss in the Porrello crime family is shot and killed while approaching a parked car. Todaro's murder was a revenge killing for plotting with the Porrello family to betray and kill his former boss Joe Lonardo and take over the crime family in late 1927.
June 24 – Broadway based mobster Gandolfo Curto, better known as "Frankie Marlow" was found murdered in Queens after a night of dining in Manhattan. Frankie Marlow was a former associate of Brooklyn mob boss Frankie Yale. Among other things, Marlow ran a bookmaking operation under Yale's protection and was also a bootlegger, nightclub owner and boxing manager.
July 2 – Benjamin Evangelista, a religious leader and real estate tycoon, is killed with his wife and four children.  It is believed that the killings are related to possible dealings with organized crime. 
August 6 – Pittsburgh mobster Steve Monastero is shot to death at the entrance of Allegheny General Hospital. Following Monastero's death, he would be succeeded by Joseph Siragusa.
August 17 – James Alderman, a prominent Florida bootlegger, who was sentenced to hang the previous year by US District Court Judge Henry D. Clayton for the 1927 murders of a US Secret Service agent and two US Coast Guard crew members during an arrest at sea, goes to the gallows. Despite appeals to the US Supreme Court and President Herbert Hoover, Alderman is hanged on a Coast Guard base near Fort Lauderdale, Florida.
September 4 – Westside O'Donnell gang member Frank Cawley is killed. 
November 17 – John "Bilikens" Rito, a former bootlegger for the Chicago Genna brothers, is killed shortly after forming a partnership with North Side Gang member Ted Newberry. 
November 29 – Los Angeles Vintner Frank Baumgarteker "Disappears" after alleged confrontation with organized Crime Figures {Joseph Ardizzone}
December 29 – Chicago bootlegger James Walsh is killed by Charles Baron after a prize fight. 
December 30 – Stephanie St. Clair, the Harlem, New York numbers game queen, is arrested by New York City police. She would later be sentenced to eight months in prison.

Arts and literature
Little Caesar (novel) by William R. Burnett.

Births
Donald Angelini (Don Angel) "The Wizard of Odds", Syndicate gambling racketeer 
Frank Chin, Chinese-American author and playwright
Louis Manna "Bobby", Genovese crime family Capo involved in the New Jersey construction industry, illegal gambling and loansharking 
Frank A. Pugliano "Frankie Pugs", Patriarca crime family associate and West Springfield gambling club owner  
Joseph Ullo, New York mobster and suspected ".22 caliber" hitman 
January 1 – Joseph Lombardo "The Clown", Chicago Outfit leader
April 7 – Joe Gallo (Joseph Gallo), New York Mafia leader 
April 9 – Joe "Pegleg" Morgan, Mexican Mafia Boss
March 8 – Nicky Scarfo (Nicodemo Scarfo) "Little Nicky", Philadelphia and Atlantic City Mafia Don
July 27 – Carmen Milano, Los Angeles crime family underboss
August 9 – Albert Caesar Tocco, Chicago Outfit member involved in extortion and racketeering in Chicago's South Suburbs

Deaths
January – James Alderman, Florida bootlegger 
January 8 – Pasquale Lolordo, Unione Siciliane leader 
March 15 – William J. Vercoe "Clown for the Hoodlums", Chicago criminal 
February 14 – James Clark, North Side Gang member involved in bootlegging, bank robbery and victim of the St. Valentine's Day Massacre 
February 14 – Frank Gusenberg, North Side Gang gunman and victim of the St. Valentine's Day Massacre
February 14 – Peter Gusenberg,  North Side Gang gunman and victim of the St. Valentine's Day Massacre
February 14 – Adam Hyer, North Side Gang member, owner of the S-M-C Cartage Company garage and victim of the St. Valentine's Day Massacre 
February 14 – John May, North Side Gang associate and victim of the St. Valentine's Day Massacre 
February 14 – Rheinhart Schwimmer, North Side Gang associate and victim of the St. Valentine's Day Massacre
February 14 – Albert Weinshank, North Side Gang bookkeeper, speakeasy owner and victim of the St. Valentine's Day Massacre 
April 14 – George Clifford, Westside O'Donnells member 
May 7 – Albert Anselmi, Chicago Outfit hitman and Scalise, and a fellow gangster named Joseph Giunta
May 16 – Joe Pozzaro, Bootlegger
May 29 – Thomas McElligot, Westside O'Donnell member 
June 11 – Salvatore Todaro "Black Sam", Cleveland crime family leader 
July 2 – Benjamin Evangelista, Illinois religious leader and real estate tycoon
August 6 – Steve Monastero, Pittsburgh crime family leader 
September 4 – Frank Cawley, Westside O'Donnell member
November 17 – John Rito "Bilikens", bootlegger for the Genna Brothers and associate of Ted Newberry 
December 29 – James Walsh, Chicago bootlegger

References 

Years in organized crime
Organized crime